Sabino Coletta (born 12 May 1914, date of death unknown) was an Argentine footballer. He played in seven matches for the Argentina national football team from 1936 to 1941. He was also part of Argentina's squad for the 1941 South American Championship.

References

External links
 

1914 births
Year of death missing
Argentine footballers
Argentina international footballers
Place of birth missing
Association football defenders
Club Atlético Lanús footballers
Club Atlético Independiente footballers
CR Flamengo footballers
Argentine expatriate footballers
Expatriate footballers in Brazil